John Riland was  an English Anglican priest in the 17th century.

Riland was born in Gloucestershire and educated at Magdalen College, Oxford. He held livings in  Exhall and Birmingham. He was Archdeacon of Coventry  from 1661 until his death on 3 March 1673.

Notes

1673 deaths
17th-century English Anglican priests
Archdeacons of Coventry
Alumni of Magdalen College, Oxford
People from Gloucestershire